Valery Alexandrovich Chekhov (Russian: Валерий Чехов; born 27 November 1955) is a Russian chess grandmaster and former World Junior Chess Champion (1975).

He was awarded the International Master title in 1975 and became a Grandmaster in 1984. He was first or tied for first at Lvov 1983, Irkutsk 1983, Barcelona 1984, Dresden 1985, and the Berlin Open 1986.

Bibliography

References

External links

1955 births
Living people
Chess grandmasters
Russian chess players
Russian chess writers
Soviet chess players
World Junior Chess Champions